Montague Merton Barker (20 July 1867 – 12 January 1954) was an English first-class cricketer and international field hockey player.

The son of Montague Cochrane Barker, he was born at Paddington in July 1867. He was educated at Radley College. He toured the West Indies with R. S. Lucas' XI in 1894–95, making his debut in first-class cricket on the tour against Barbados at Bridgetown. He made seven further first-class appearances on the tour, scoring 94 runs at an average of 9.40 and a high score of 30. He later made two first-class appearances for the Marylebone Cricket Club against Leicestershire in 1895 and Derbyshire in 1896. Outside of cricket, he played field hockey as a half-back for England, captaining the team in 1898. He died at Epsom Downs in January 1954.

References

External links

1867 births
1954 deaths
People from Paddington
People educated at Radley College
English cricketers
R. S. Lucas' XI cricketers
Marylebone Cricket Club cricketers
English male field hockey players